The University Institute of Technology of Mantes en Yvelines (UIT of Mantes en Yvelines) is one of the French University Institutes of Technology.

It is part of Versailles Saint-Quentin-en-Yvelines University and located at Mantes-la-Jolie.

It trains technicians in two or three years after the Baccalaureate.

It allows the preparation of a two-year undergraduate technical diploma called a Diplôme universitaire de technologie (DUT) (Associate of Science) and a three-year undergraduate technical diploma called a Licence professionnelle (professional Bachelor).

History 
The UIT of Mantes en Yvelines was created in 2001 as a component of the Versailles Saint-Quentin-en-Yvelines University.

Faculties 
This UIT has six faculties:
 Management and Administrations
 Industrial Engineering and Maintenance
 Marketing techniques
 Civil engineering
 Health, Safety and Environment

References

Versailles Saint-Quentin-en-Yvelines University
Technical universities and colleges in France
Educational institutions established in 2001
2001 establishments in France